Coleophora erratella is a moth of the family Coleophoridae. It is found in southern Russia and Afghanistan.

The larvae feed on the leaves of Artemisia species, including A. kopetdaghensis, A. badhysi and A. turanica.

References

erratella
Moths of Asia